Latvian Athletics Championships is the national championships in athletics, organized by Latvian Athletics Union.

Championships 

1991
1992
1993
1994
1995
1996
1997
1998
1999
2000

2001
2002
2003
2004
2005
2006
2007
2008, Valmiera
2009, Ventspils
2010, Jēkabpils

2011
2012
2013
2014
2015
2016
2017
2018
1999
2020, Jelgava

Events 

Men
100 m
200 m
400 m
800 m
1500 m
3000 m
5000 m
110 m hurdles
400 m hurdles
3000 m steeplechase
Half marathon
Marathon
High Jump
Pole Vault
Long Jump
Triple Jump
Shot Put
Discus Throw
Javelin Throw
Hammer Throw
4 × 100 m
4 × 400 m

Women
100 m
200 m
400 m
800 m
1500 m
3000 m
5000 m
100 m hurdles
400 m hurdles
3000 m steeplechase
Half marathon
Marathon
High Jump
Pole Vault
Long Jump
Triple Jump
Shot Put
Discus Throw
Javelin Throw
Hammer Throw
4 × 100 m
4 × 400 m

External links
Latvian Athletics Union homepage

 
National athletics competitions
Athletics competitions in Latvia